International Salt Co. v. United States, 332 U.S. 392 (1947), was a case in which the United States Supreme Court held that the Sherman Act prohibits as per se violations all tying arrangements in which a product for which a seller has a legal monopoly, such as a patent, requires purchasers to buy as well a product for which the seller has no legal monopoly.

Background
The defendant, International Salt Company, had patented machines for processing salt and mixing or injecting it into various foodstuffs. The company required those who leased machines to buy the salt or salt tablets as well, which was processed through the machines from the defendant. The US government brought a case charging the company of an antitrust violation by the tying of its products. The defendant replied to the charges with the contention that the tying arrangement was necessary to control the quality of salt being used in its machines and claimed that salt not meeting certain standards would damage the machines.

Issue
The Supreme Court was asked to determine whether such an arrangement was a per se violation of the antitrust laws.

Decision
The Court found a per se violation. It also rejected the defense that the associated product must meet certain standards since competitors must be given the opportunity to meet them. The defense that customers could buy elsewhere if other vendors sold at lower prices was also rejected since the defendant could foreclose the market simply by meeting it.

See also
 List of United States Supreme Court cases, volume 332
 United States v. Loew's Inc. (1962)

External links

1947 in United States case law
United States antitrust case law
United States Supreme Court cases
United States Supreme Court cases of the Vinson Court
History of salt